Seal Island is located in the Houtman Abrolhos archipelago in the Mid West region of Western Australia.

References

Islands of the Houtman Abrolhos